Mincom is the Ministry of Communications for the Government of Morocco.

See also
 Politics of Morocco

External links
 Ministry of Communications official site (English)

Government of Morocco
Communications in Morocco
Communications ministries